The 2022–23 season is the sixth season in Real Kashmir FC's existence, and their fifth season in I-League. This season of the I-League witnesses the return of the home-away format of the matches similar to that of the 2019–20 I-League season after a break of two years due to the COVID-19 pandemic in the country.

First-team squad

Contract Extension

New contracts

Transfers

Transfers in

Promoted from Real Kashmmir FC Reserves

Transfers out

Pre-season

Competition

Overview

I-League

League table

League Results by Round

Matches 
Note: I-League announced the fixtures for the 2022–23 season on 1 November 2022.

Super Cup 

After finishing 5th in the I-League, Real Kashmir will have to play a qualifier against 6th-ranked Churchill Brothers to earn a place in the group stage.

Matches

Qualifiers

Statistics

Goal Scorers

References

2021–22 in Indian football
Real Kashmir FC